

Belgium
 Belgian Congo 
 Félix Fuchs, Governor-General of the Belgian Congo (1912–1916)
 Eugène Henry, Governor-General of the Belgian Congo (1916–1921)

France
 French Somaliland –
 Paul Simoni, Governor of French Somaliland (1915–1916)
 Victor Marie Fillon, Governor of French Somaliland (1916–1918)
 Guinea – Jean Louis Georges Poiret, Lieutenant-Governor of Guinea (1915–1919)

Japan
 Karafuto –
Okada Bunji, Governor-General of Karafuto (5 June 1914 – 9 October 1916)
Masaya Akira, Governor-General of Karafuto (13 October 1916 – 17 April 1919)
 Korea –
Terauchi Masatake, Governor-General of Korea (1910–1916)
Hasegawa Yoshimichi, Governor-General of Korea (1916–1919)
 Taiwan –
Andō Sadami, Governor-General of Taiwan (May 1915 – June 1916)
Akashi Motojirō, Governor-General of Taiwan (June 1916 – November 1917)

Portugal
 Angola –
 António Júlio da Costa Pereira de Eça, Governor-General of Angola (1915–1916)
 Pedro Francisco Massano do Amorim, Governor-General of Angola (1916–1917)

United Kingdom
 Barbados – Sir Leslie Probyn, Governor of Barbados (1911–1918)
 British East Africa – Sir Henry Conway Belfield, Governor of British East Africa (1912–1917)
 British Honduras – Wilfred Collet, Governor of British Honduras (1913–1918)
 Fiji – Sir Ernest Sweet-Escott, Governor of Fiji (1912–1918)
 Malta Colony – Paul Methuen, Governor of Malta (1915–1919)
 Northern Rhodesia – Lawrence Aubrey Wallace, Administrator of Northern Rhodesia (1911–1921)

Colonial governors
Colonial governors
1916